Ylem (pronounced e-lem) is the sixth full-length studio release from German melodic black metal band Dark Fortress; and the second to feature new vocalist Morean. The album was released on January 22, 2010 in Germany, Austria, Switzerland and on January 25, 2010 for the rest of Europe. It was also released on February 9, 2010 in the United States of America.

Track listing

Bonus tracks
Bonus tracks on Slipsleeve version only

Personnel
Morean – vocals
V. Santura – lead guitar
Asvargr – guitar
Draug – bass guitar
Paymon – keyboard
Seraph – drums

Additional personnel
Christophe Szpajdel – logo

References

External links
 Dark Fortress on Myspace
 Encyclopaedia Metallum (retrieved 09-02-10)

2010 albums
Dark Fortress albums
Century Media Records albums